Calum Ferguson (born 12 February 1995) is a Association football player who plays as a forward for Scottish Highland club Brechin City. Born in Scotland, he has represented Canada at youth international levels.

Club career

Inverness Caledonian Thistle
After progressing through the youth ranks at Inverness, Ferguson made the game-day squad for the first time with the Caley Jags against his former club Ross County on 19 May 2013. Ferguson was loaned to Montrose in early 2014. He played four games before his loan ended. He would again make the game-day squad  with Inverness against Partick Thistle on 7 February 2015 in the Scottish Cup. Ferguson finally made his debut for Inverness against Kilmarnock on 21 February as a substitute in a 3–3 draw.

Albion Rovers
After leaving Inverness at the end of the 2015–16 season, Ferguson signed for Scottish League One side Albion Rovers in July 2016, after impressing as a trialist in a pre-season friendly against Motherwell. Ferguson hit the headlines with Albion Rovers when he scored a dramatic last minute winner in the  Scottish Cup against Queen of the South to send his side through to play Celtic.

Elgin City
In summer 2017, Ferguson signed with Scottish League Two side Elgin City.

Valour FC
On 3 April 2019, Ferguson signed with Canadian Premier League side Valour FC after a trial. He had previously spent time on trial with HFX Wanderers FC. He made his debut for Valour on 8 May against Cavalry FC. On 11 May, Ferguson scored his first goal for Valour in a 1–0 win over HFX Wanderers. On 7 October 2019, Ferguson was granted an early leave from the club to pursue opportunities in New Zealand.

Canterbury United
On 1 November 2019, Ferguson signed with New Zealand Football Championship side Canterbury United FC. He made his debut on 2 November as a starter in a 1–0 loss to Eastern Suburbs.

Warrenpoint Town
After spending 2021 with NPSL side Erie Commodores, Ferguson signed with NIFL Premiership side Warrenpoint Town until the end of the season on 13 February 2022.

International career
Ferguson's mother was born in Canada, and as a result he has eligibility for both Canada and Scotland. He made his debut for Canada at the under-18 level at the 2013 Torneo COTIF, where he scored a goal against Belarus. In 2014, he progressed to the under-20 team and participated at the 2014 Milk Cup and the 2015 CONCACAF U-20 Championship.

Ferguson was called up by Cascadia for the 2018 ConIFA World Football Cup. He finished the tournament with 5 goals in 6 games as Cascadia finished 6th overall.

Personal life
Ferguson is a fluent speaker of Scottish Gaelic and appeared regularly on BBC Radio nan Gàidheal and BBC Alba.

Career statistics

See also
 List of Scottish Gaelic-speaking people

References

External links

1995 births
Living people
Association football forwards
Citizens of Canada through descent
Canadian soccer players
Scottish footballers
Footballers from Inverness
Scottish people of Canadian descent
Canadian expatriate soccer players
Scottish expatriate footballers
Expatriate association footballers in New Zealand
Canadian expatriate sportspeople in New Zealand
Scottish expatriate sportspeople in New Zealand
Expatriate soccer players in the United States
Canadian expatriate sportspeople in the United States
Scottish expatriate sportspeople in the United States
Expatriate association footballers in Northern Ireland
Canadian expatriate sportspeople in Northern Ireland
Inverness Caledonian Thistle F.C. players
Montrose F.C. players
Albion Rovers F.C. players
Elgin City F.C. players
Valour FC players
Canterbury United players
Warrenpoint Town F.C. players
Scottish Professional Football League players
Canadian Premier League players
New Zealand Football Championship players
National Premier Soccer League players
Canada men's youth international soccer players
2015 CONCACAF U-20 Championship players